Estadio Municipal Jose Bento Pessoa is a multi-use stadium in Figueira da Foz, Portugal.  It is currently used mostly for football matches and is home of the Naval 1º de Maio. The stadium is able to hold 10,000 people.

References

Jose Bento Pessoa
Jose Bento Pessoa
Buildings and structures in Coimbra District
Sports venues completed in 1953